The 1886 Yale Bulldogs football team was an American football team that represented Yale University as a member of the Intercollegiate Football Association (IFA) during the 1886 college football season. The team finished with a 9–0–1 record, shut out nine of ten opponents, and outscored all opponents by a total of 687 to 4. Robert Corwin was the team captain.

There was no contemporaneous system in 1887 for determining a national champion. However, Yale was retroactively named as the national champion by the Helms Athletic Foundation and National Championship Foundation and a co-national champion by Parke H. Davis.

On Thanksgiving Day in Princeton, New Jersey, undefeated teams from Yale and Princeton met. The game started late due to the absence of a referee, and heavy rain caused the game to be called on account of darkness with Yale leading 4–0 in the second half. Under the rules of the time, the game was declared "no contest" by the substitute referee, and the final score was declared to be 0–0. After a special meeting of the Intercollegiate Football Association held to review the game, the Association issued a two-part resolution: that (1) Yale should have been acknowledged the winner, but that (2) under their existing rules, the Association did not have the authority to award the game to them.

Schedule

References

Yale
Yale Bulldogs football seasons
College football national champions
College football undefeated seasons
Yale Bulldogs football